James Proudfoot (31 January 1906–1963) was an English footballer who played in the Football League for Barnsley, Notts County, Southend United and Southport.

References

1906 births
1963 deaths
English footballers
Association football forwards
English Football League players
Barnsley F.C. players
Notts County F.C. players
Southend United F.C. players
Yeovil Town F.C. players
Southport F.C. players
Ashington A.F.C. players